is a female gravure idol of Japan. She is from Tokyo, and belongs to the show-business production Platica Inc., a subsidiary of Face Network Co., Ltd.

Profile 
 Nickname: Saorin
 Profession: Gravure idol (Japanese term: swimsuit/bikini model)
 Date of Birth: 9 August 1984
 Birthplace: Tokyo, Japan
 Height: 162 cm (5 feet and 3.8 inches)
 Measurements: B80 W56 H81 cm (B31.5 W22.0 H31.9 inches)
 Talent Agency: Platica Inc.

History 
 When Saori worked as a promotional model, she was headhunted by Face Network Co., Ltd. and subsequently became an exclusive race queen of that company.
 During her one-year activities as a race queen, Saori was exceptionally promoted to a gravure idol by the manager of Face Network's show business division, which is Platica Inc. of today.
 In April 2006, she debuted in a men's magazine. Soon afterward, she appears as a gravure idol in several magazines one after another.
 After January 2007, her DVD releases again and again. Especially, 5th DVD "Lovely Flower♥" was additionally published, because the first edition had sold out very soon.
 Saori also appears on TV after 2007.
 In April 2008, she got to belong to Platica Inc. automatically through independence of the firm.

Filmography

TV Programs 
 Cream Nantoka (くりぃむナントカ), TV Asahi 2007
 Enta no Mikata! (エンタの味方!), TBS 2007-08
 Gravure no Bishojo (グラビアの美少女), MONDO21 2008

DVDs 
 Saorin to Issho♥ - Nikkori Side - (さおりんといっしょ♥ ～にっこりサイド～), Sparkvision 2007
 Saorin to Issho♥ - Shittori Side - (さおりんといっしょ♥ ～しっとりサイド～), Sparkvision 2007
 Saorin LOVE♥ (さおりんLove♥), Take Shobo 2007
 Daisuki♥ (大好きっ♥), GRADIA 2007
 Lovely Flower♥, Shinyusha 2008
 Tokimeki Love♥ (ときめきLove♥), Trico 2008

References

External links 
 Platica Inc. 
 Official Profile: Saori Horii 
 Saorin to Issho♥  - Official Blog with her photographs, since April 2008

1984 births
Living people
People from Tokyo
Japanese gravure idols
Japanese television personalities